Justin Duane James (born September 13, 1981) is a former American professional baseball pitcher. He played in Major League Baseball for the Oakland Athletics in 2010.

James attended the University of Missouri. He was drafted by the Boston Red Sox in the 6th round of the 2001 MLB Draft, but did not sign. In 2002, he played collegiate summer baseball with the Brewster Whitecaps of the Cape Cod Baseball League. He was selected again by the Toronto Blue Jays in the 5th round of the 2003 MLB Draft, and signed.

In 2007, James was traded to the Cincinnati Reds. He played for the Reds organization in 2008, but became a minor league free agent. In 2009, James played for the Kansas City T-Bones of the independent Northern League.

The Athletics purchased James' contract in June 2010. He received his first promotion to the major leagues on September 1, 2010, making his major league debut the following day.

On November 2, 2010, James was claimed off waivers by the Milwaukee Brewers. He was outrighted to Triple-A on June 27, 2011. James currently lives in Columbia, MO where he coaches baseball and is the operating owner of Nutrishop Columbia, a supplement and nutrition store.

References

External links
 

Major League Baseball pitchers
Oakland Athletics players
Auburn Doubledays players
Dunedin Blue Jays players
Charleston AlleyCats players
New Hampshire Fisher Cats players
Syracuse Chiefs players
Chattanooga Lookouts players
Sarasota Reds players
Gulf Coast Reds players
Kansas City T-Bones players
Sacramento River Cats players
Midland RockHounds players
Arizona League Brewers players
Huntsville Stars players
Nashville Sounds players
Missouri Tigers baseball players
Brewster Whitecaps players
Baseball players from Oklahoma
Living people
1981 births
Sportspeople from Oklahoma City
People from Yukon, Oklahoma
Scottsdale Scorpions players
Phoenix Desert Dogs players